Halit Bey Bërzeshta (1840 – 1909) was an Ottoman Albanian military physician and activist of the Albanian National Awakening.

Biography
Bërzeshta was born in Bërzeshta, Vilayet of Monastir, Ottoman Albania (today Librazhd District, Albania) in 1840. 
He was a member of the Secret Association of the Albanians of Monastir, the Secret Committee for the Liberation of Albania, and one of the main Albanian activists in Monastir, where he joined forces with Bajo Topulli supporting guerrilla fighting against the Ottoman government. He died in 1909.

References

1840 births
1909 deaths
People from Librazhd
19th-century Albanian military personnel
20th-century Albanian military personnel
Activists of the Albanian National Awakening
Albanians from the Ottoman Empire
People from Manastir vilayet